Barryoe GAA club is a Gaelic football and Hurling club in the parish of Barryroe in County Cork, Ireland. It draws its players from the villages of Courtmacsherry, Butlerstown, Lislevane and surrounding areas. The club participates in the south west Cork (Carbery) division of Cork and operates at Intermediate A level in hurling and Junior A in football.

History
The Barryroe Club was founded in 1892 and thus is one of the oldest in the Carbery GAA division. Like many other clubs it has gone out of existence for various periods. Since it was reformed in 1961 however, several Junior A Hurling titles plus a number of minor and Under-21 Championships have been won. Most of its successes have been in hurling.
 
Barryroe won their seventh West Cork Junior A Hurling Championship on Sunday 9 September 2007 in Timoleague defeating Newcestown by 3-12 to 0-6. They followed this up with wins over Erin's Own and Kinsale to reach their second County Final. In this final they beat Charleville by 2-19 to 2-13 to win the Cork Junior 'A' Hurling Championship for the first time. The club have participated in the Intermediate A since 2008.

Notable players
 Robbie Kiely 
 Jennifer O'Leary - Cork Senior Camogie player

Honours
 Munster Junior Club Hurling Championship: Runners-Up: 2007
 Cork Junior A Hurling Championship: Winners (1) 2007 Runners Up 1994 Semi Finalists 1986, 2006
 Cork Junior B Football Championship Winners (1) 2002
 Cork Minor B Hurling Championship: Beaten Finalists 2005
 Cork Minor B Football Championship: Winners (1) 2000, Runners-Up 1999
 Cork Minor C Football Championship: Winners (1) 2005
 West Cork Junior A Hurling Championship: Winners (7) 1981, 1982, 1986, 1987, 1994, 2006, 2007 Runners Up 1985, 1992, 1996, 1999, 2000, 2002
 West Cork Junior A Football Championship: Runners-Up: 1980, 1994, 2003
 West Cork Junior B Hurling Championship: Winners (3) 1933, 1953, 2007 Runners-Up: 1950, 1964, 1974, 1977,
 South West Cork Junior B Football Championship: Winners (5) 1964, 1979, 1989, 1998, 2002 Runners-Up: 1944, 1967, 1976, 1988
 South West Cork Junior C Hurling Championship: Winners (3) 1987, 1992, 2004 Runners-Up 1985, 1986,
 West Cork Junior D Football Championship: Runners-Up 2002
 West Cork Minor A Hurling Championship: Winners (7) 1977, 1978, 1983, 1986, 1988, 1989, 2001 Runners-Up 1979, 1980, 1984, 1990, 1994, 1999, 2000, 2006
 West Cork Minor B Hurling Championship: Winners (6) 1968, 1976, 1977, 1978, 1979, 1980  Runners-Up 1970
 West Cork Minor B Football Championship Winners (2) 1999, 2000
 West Cork Minor C Football Championship Winners (1) 2005
 West Cork Minor D Football Championship Winners (2) 2008, 2009
 West Cork Under-21 A Hurling Championship Winners (5) 1980, 1981, 1985, 1988, 1990  Runners-Up: 1978,1983, 1986, 1989, 1991, 2003
 West Cork Under-21 B Hurling Championship Winners (3) 1976, 1977, 2006  Runners-Up: 1973, 1974
 West Cork Under-21 B Football Championship Winners (3) 1987, 1988, 1989  Runners-Up: 1978, 1985, 1995
 West Cork Under-21 C Football Championship Runners-Up 2011

References

External links
Official Barryroe GAA Club website

Hurling clubs in County Cork
Gaelic football clubs in County Cork
Gaelic games clubs in County Cork